Lycoperdon is a genus of puffball mushrooms. The genus has a widespread distribution and contains about 50 species. In general, it contains the smaller species such as the pear-shaped puffball and the gem-studded puffball. It was formerly classified within the now-obsolete order Lycoperdales, as the type genus which, following a restructuring of fungal taxonomy brought about by molecular phylogeny, has been split. Lycoperdon is now placed in the family Agaricaceae of the order Agaricales.

The scientific name has been created with Greek words (lycos meaning wolf and perdon meaning to fart) and based on several European dialects in which the mushroom name sounds like wolf-farts. 

Most species are edible, ranging from mild to tasting distinctly of shrimp.

Species
 Lycoperdon caudatum (Syn. Lycoperdon pedicellatum) J.Schröt.
 Lycoperdon curtisii
 Lycoperdon echinatum  Pers.
 Lycoperdon ericaceum (Syn. Lycoperdon muscorum)
 Lycoperdon ericaceum, var. subareolatum
 Lycoperdon lambinonii Demoulin 1972
 Lycoperdon lividum (Syn. Lycoperdon spadiceum) Pers. 1809
 Lycoperdon mammiforme Pers. 1801
 Lycoperdon marginatum (Syn. Lycoperdon candidum) Vittadini
 Lycoperdon molle
 Lycoperdon nigrescens (Syn. Lycoperdon foetidum) Bonord
 Lycoperdon norvegicum Demoulin 1971
 Lycoperdon ovoidisporum
 Lycoperdon perlatum (Syn. Lycoperdon gemmatum)
 Lycoperdon pratense
 Lycoperdon pyriforme  Schaeff. 1774
 Lycoperdon pulcherrimum Berk. & M.A. Curtis
 Lycoperdon rupicola
 Lycoperdon subincarnatum
 Lycoperdon subumbrinum
 Lycoperdon umbrinum

See also
List of Agaricales genera
List of Agaricaceae genera

References

External links

 
Agaricales genera
Agaricaceae
Puffballs